Glenarm Lower is a barony in County Antrim, Northern Ireland. To its east runs the east-Antrim coast, and it is bordered by five other baronies: Cary to the north; Dunluce Lower and Kilconway to the west; Antrim Lower to the south-west; and Glenarm Upper to the south-east.

Geographical features
Geographical features of Glenarm Lower include:
Lurigethan hill
Collin Top, Tievebulliagh, and Trostan mountains
Glencloy valley

List of settlements
Below is a list of settlements in Glenarm Lower:

Villages
Carnlough
Cushendall
Waterfoot
Glenarm

Hamlets and population centres
Carnalbanagh Sheddings
Feystown
Garronpoint
Straidkelly

List of civil parishes
Below is a list of civil parishes in Glenarm Lower:
Ardclinis
Grange of Inispollen
Grange of Layd
Layd
Tickmacrevan

References